This is a list of television broadcasters which provide coverage of the Copa Libertadores, South American football's top level continental competition.

Television broadcasters

2023-2026

South America

International

References 

Broadcasters
Copa Libertadores